Sinŭiju, known before 1925 in English as Yeng Byen City, is a city in North Korea which faces Dandong, Liaoning, China across the international border of the Yalu River. It is the capital of North P'yŏngan province. Part of the city is included in the Sinŭiju Special Administrative Region, which was established in 2002 to experiment with introducing a market economy. In recent years, the city, despite lagging behind the development in the capital Pyongyang, has seen a small construction boom and increasing tourism from China.

Geography

Sinŭiju is bordered by the Amnok River, and by P'ihyŏn and Ryongch'ŏn counties. The city's altitude is 1 metre (4 feet) above sea level. There are several islands at the mouth of the Amnok River - Wihwa-do, Rim-do, Ryuch'o-do and Tongryuch'o-do.

Administrative divisions
Sinuiju city is the heart of the Sinuiju Special Administrative Region. The city is currently divided into 49 tong (neighbourhoods) and 9 ri (villages):

History 
Developed as a major settlement during the colonial rule at the terminus of a railway bridge across the Amrok River, Sinuiju is located 11 km (7 miles) south by southwest of Ŭiju, the old city from whose name Sinŭiju (meaning “New Ŭiju”) derives. As an open port, it grew commercially with the logging industry which uses the Amnok River to transport lumber. Additionally, a chemical industry developed after the hydroelectric Sup'ung Dam was built further up the river.

In the course of the Korean War, after being driven from P'yŏngyang, Kim Il Sung and his government temporarily moved its capital to Sinŭiju - although as UNC forces approached, the government again moved - this time to Kanggye. Also, the city sustained heavy damage from aerial bombardment as part of the United States Air Force's strategic bombing of North Korea; 95 percent of the city was destroyed. However, the city has since been rebuilt.

In 2018, a master plan for the redevelopment of the city was unveiled and shown to Kim Jong-un, which would have featured many high rise buildings and parks, centered around the road leading to the statues of Kim Il Sung and Kim Jong Il. Ultimately, this plan has yet to be fulfilled, with the only major work completed being the repaving of roads leading to the statues and the red coloured, circular apartment building behind and the Sinuiju Youth Open Air Theatre's completion, although the industrial areas in the city have seen some reconstruction.

Economy

An important light industry centre in North Korea, Sinŭiju has a plant manufacturing enamelled ironware as well as a textile mill, paper mill and an afforestation factory. Its southwest harbour has a shipyard, although the shipyard's main function is seemingly to dismantle ships for scrap metal and other usable materials rather than building new ships. The area has recycling plants which recycle a wide range of material, including products that are banned for recycling in China. The Sinŭiju Cosmetics Factory is located in South Sinŭiju (Namsinŭiju).

Trade with China
A substantial portion of North Korea's international trade, both legal and illegal, passes through Sinuiju and Dandong, across the Yalu River.

Central market
Since 2002, commercial life has been centred on the Chaeha-dong Market.  Based on a satellite image taken on 30 October 2012, the market has been destroyed and is being made into a new park.

Transportation

Sinŭiju can be reached from P'yŏngyang by air, railway and road. It can be reached from Dandong in China by crossing the Amnok River by bridge or boat. Foreign tourists on excursion boats from Dandong are sometimes permitted to approach within a few meters of the city's coastline, as long as they do not land.

Air
Sinŭiju's airport has a single turf runway 03/21 measuring 991 metres by 61 metres (3250 feet by 213 feet). Air Koryŏ operates passenger and cargo flights from P'yŏngyang.

Rail
Sinŭiju Ch'ŏngnyŏn Station is the northern terminus of the Korean State Railway's P'yŏngŭi Line from P'yŏngyang; the district is also served by several other stations on the P'yŏngŭi line, as well as the Tŏkhyŏn and Paengma lines. The factories of the city of Sinŭiju are provided with railway service via the Kang'an Line.

Urban transit 
Sinuiju has a trolleybus line that runs from the city centre to the railway station. It was reopened in October 2020 with new trolleybuses derived from the Pyongyang Chollima-321 trolleybus. It formerly had another line running from the Sinuiju Chongnyon Station to Ragwon Machine Complex that closed between 2005 and 2009 with the reconstruction of the highway with a shifted alignment.

Climate 
Sinŭiju has a monsoonal humid continental climate (Köppen Dwa) with hot, humid and stormy summers and cold, dry winters with little snowfall.

Places of interest

Facilities in Sinŭiju include Sinŭiju High School, Sinŭiju Commercial High School, Eastern Middle School, Sinŭiju Light Industry University, Sinŭiju University of Medicine and the Sinuiju University of Education. Scenic sites include the Tonggun Pavilion, Waterfall, and Hot Springs.

There also is a Ferris wheel overlooking the Yalu River, reportedly broken.

Notable people
Sohn Kee-chung, South Korean Olympic athlete and long-distance runner
Yi Sung-sun, South Korean street knight
Yushoku Cho, Japanese speed skater

See also

 List of cities in North Korea
 Geography of North Korea
 Sinuiju Incident
 Sinuiju North Korean Leader's Residence

Notes

References

Further reading

External links

City profile of Sinuiju 
North Korea Uncovered , (North Korea Google Earth) see a mapping of Sinuiju's main infrastructure, power lines, railroad, detention center, and Kim Jong Il residence, plus a whole lot more.

 
Cities in North Pyongan
China–North Korea border crossings
Port cities and towns in North Korea